The Bienvenidos al Noa Noa Gira is a North American tour by Mexican singer and songwriter Juan Gabriel.

Commercial reception 
Tickets for the tour were available to the public on June 19, 2015 and June 26, 2015 on select dates with ticket prices ranging from US$55.00 - US $256.00 in the United States.

Shows

References 

2015 concert tours